San Antonio, officially the Municipality of San Antonio, is a 2nd class municipality in the province of Zambales, Philippines. According to the 2020 census, it has a population of 37,450 people.

History
San Antonio was a hunting region where indigenous hunters from the northern towns of Zambales would hunt, and gather. The first settlers from the Paoay area in Ilocos Norte arrived in 1830, and founded the first Spanish settlement that developed into what is now San Antonio.

San Antonio was given the status of district or barrio in 1836. The town mayor in that period was Don Gregorio Banaga. He governed the town from 1836 to 1849. He was succeeded by Don Vicente Lacuesta in 1849, from Teniente Primero to Teniente Absoluto. The last mayor was Don Santiago Ladrillono. He was succeeded by Don Dimas Pascasio as governor in 1856. They selected their leaders every year. In 1891 to 1898, Don Pablo Corpus was the only Capitan Municipal selected then appointed Don Felix Magsaysay as the first President municipal, and many more followed up to 1931 to 1945.

The town was the site of the United States Navy Base known as the U.S. Naval Communications Station San Miguel. After the earthquake and eruption of Mount Pinatubo in 1991, the United States Military decided to abandon its military bases in the Philippines.

Geography

Barangays
San Antonio is politically subdivided into 14 barangays.

Climate

Demographics

Economy

Tourism
San Antonio is increasingly known for its beaches, mountains and coves, and is a destination for campers and beach goers.

 Casa San Miguel: Founded by violinist Coke Bolipata, the community center provides its members the time and space for developing their interest and talent in classical music.
Tiklados Applied Music Center (Tiklados): Located at Barangay Antipolo, it was founded by Dr. Ceferino Cariaso III in 2002, to tutor young pianists and guitarists. The center caters to the following instruments: piano, violin, guitar, organ, flute, and voice. Solfege and music theory are also offered in the center. At present, Tiklados has three piano rooms, one violin/voice room, a spacious faculty and staff lounge, and a 60-seater concert hall.
Pundaquit: Nestled in the navel of the Zambales coastline, a Spanish Light House from the 1800s is found atop the "Islas de Punta Capones." This is reminiscent of places such as "Sierra Leone." Zambales is also home to the famous Crystal Beach surf in the town of San Narciso. This surf spot is known as a "surfing paradise" closest to Manila.
Redondo Peninsula: A short mountainous peninsula extending about 15 kilometers (9 miles) to the south of Zambales on western Luzon in the Philippines. It separates Subic Bay and the coasts around the Subic Bay Metropolitan Area of Subic and Olongapo from the South China Sea. It is known for its secluded coves, beaches and pine-forested mountains.
Anawangin Cove: It is a crescent shaped cove with a pristine white sand beach. What makes the place unique is the unusual riddle of tall pine-like trees flourishing round its vicinity. In fact they are not pine trees; they are agoho trees, a species endemic to the Philippines, some Southeast Asian countries and north-eastern parts of Australia. There are no roads leading to Anawangin. It is only accessible by a 30-minute boat ride from Pundaquit, San Antonio, or by a six-hour trek through hot, open trails thru the Pundaquit range. The cove's relative isolation has kept it free from development. Just behind the beach is the pine forest and a marsh, where there are natural springs feeding to the sea. The area is home to a number of bird species.
Nagsasa Cove
Talisayin Cove
Silangen Cove
Capones Island
Camara Island

Education

Elementary
 College of Hildegarde Von Bingen (C.H.V.B)
 San Antonio Central Elementary School (S.A.C.E.S)
 West Dirita Elementary School
 Dirita Elementary School
 San Esteban Elementary School
 San Gregorio Elementary School(S.G.E.S)
 San Juan Elementary School
 San Nicolas Elementary School
 San Miguel Elementary School
 Pundakit Elementary School
 Angel Manglicmot Memorial School (formerly Angeles Elementary School)
 Teodoro R. Yangco Elementary School(T.R.Y.M.S)
 Teodoro R. Yangco Catholic Educational Institute(T.R.Y.C.E.I)
 Valiant Educational Institute
High School
 Angel C. Manglicmot High School (A.C.M.H.S.)
 Pundakit High School
 Luzon Technical Institute, Inc(L.T.I)
 Teodoro R. Yangco Catholic Educational Institute(T.R.Y.C.E.I)
 San Miguel National High School
 San Antonio National High School
 Valiant Educational Institute
 College of Hildegarde Von Bingen (C.H.V.B)
Montessori
 Precious Child Montessori
 Escuela Royal de Maria Montessori
St.Anthony Montessori of Zambales Inc.

Sports
San Antonio, influenced by the presence of the United States Naval Communication Station in the late '50s, is the baseball and softball capital of Zambales. Mayor Zozimo Pascasio and the Holy Name Society adopted the program in the '60s and '70s. Their partnership produced players who became athletic scholars in various colleges and universities in Manila. In the early '80s, JJ Henry & Chuck Jones of FRA Branch 367 (US Navy retirees) living in San Antonio, further enhanced the enthusiasm for the sport through the Shipmates, a team of 10- to 12-year-old boys coming from the different barangays who competed in the PABA  (Philippine Amateur Baseball Association) Invitational. In 1985, the core of the team intact & playing for TR Yangco Educational Institute, the Shipmates coached by Butch Echiverre, won the baseball gold in the CLRAA (Central Luzon Regional Athletic Association), a first for Zambales. The San Antonio "TNT" Jaycees, most of whom are employees at the US Navy base, continued the program with their annual San Antonio Summer Baseball Cup successfully.

After the eruption of Mt Pinatubo in 1991, due to the destruction of the playing fields and the withdrawal of the US bases, support for the baseball program dwindled. Eager to find an alternative sports activity, Butch Echiverre and some friends introduced darts to the community. From its humble beginnings at a place called "Kubo," presently, the Zambales Darters Federation is considered as one of the best dart organizations in the country for having hosted several national competitions. Its "no-school, no-play" policy is now adopted nationwide and the NDFP (National Darts Federation of the Philippines) conferred the President's Award to the group during the Darterong Pinoy 2012.

The community's love for baseball was rekindled in the late '90s after losing the provincial baseball crown to Botolan, Zambales. The SADTEA (San Antonio District Teachers & Employees Association) took the initiative of organizing an inter-school tournament. This time, a softball tournament for girls is included. Supported by some officials of the local government and equipment donated by San Antonians locally & abroad, San Antonio baseball/softball is better than it ever was. As a member of the Little League Asia Pacific Region, San Antonio has always reached the quarterfinals of the Philippine Series. Irwin Mata is the Little League President of San Antonio.

Aside from fast becoming a surfing capital of Luzon, San Antonio has an 18-hole golf course at the Naval Education and Training Command of the Philippine Navy (formerly US Naval Communication Station).

Notable personalities

 Don Teodoro R. Yangco, noted philanthropist and business magnate, was born in San Antonio, Zambales on November 9, 1861. He obtained his Bachelor of Arts from the Ateneo de Manila University and studied law at the University of Santo Tomás. He pursued a commercial course at Ealing College in London from 1882 to 1886. He served as Resident Commissioner of the Philippine Islands from 1917 to 1920 in Washington D.C. In 1923, he represented the Philippine Chamber of Commerce at the first Pan-Pacific Commercial Conference held in Honolulu, where he ably defended Philippine Independence. He generously supported the local YMCA such that he came to be called the “Father of the YMCA in the Philippines.” He died on April 20, 1939, and was buried at the North Cemetery.
 Guillermo Pablo, Associate Justice of the Supreme Court of the Philippines from 1945 to 1955, was born on June 25, 1886, in San Antonio, Zambales.  Prior to his appointment to the High Court, he was Justice of the Peace (1911) at Iba, Zambales; Acting Provincial Fiscal (1915) of Zambales, Member of the Philippine Legislature (1916–1922); CFI Auxiliary Judge (1924) at Cebu; and CFI Judge (1930) and CFI District Judge (1934).

In film
 The Bea Alonzo and Sam Milby movie And I Love You So, was shot at Anawangin Cove in San Antonio, a 30-minute boat ride from Pundaquit.

References

External links

San Antonio Profile at PhilAtlas.com
[ Philippine Standard Geographic Code]
Philippine Census Information

Municipalities of Zambales
Beaches of the Philippines